The Maschinengewehr 30, or MG 30 was a German-designed machine gun that saw some service with various armed forces in the 1930s. It was also modified to become the standard German aircraft gun as the MG 15 and MG 17. It is most notable as the design pattern that led to the MG 34 and MG 42, and thus is one of the major ancestors of many of the weapons in service which would later find widespread use into the 21st century.

History
Development of the MG 30 took place under the direction of Louis Stange at Rheinmetall's Sömmerda office. However actual production of machine guns was prohibited in Germany under the Versailles Treaty. Rheinmetall circumvented the provisions by acquiring the majority shareholding of the Swiss manufacturer Waffenfabrik Solothurn AG and relocating production there. The goal was to acquire orders for the rearmament of the Reichswehr, which was modernizing its arsenal.

The design was rejected by the German Reichswehr which adopted the MG 13. Rheinmetall then turned to other companies and licensed the design to Solothurn in Switzerland and Steyr-Daimler-Puch in Austria. Production soon followed, entering the armed forces of both countries as the Solothurn S2-200 and Maschinengewehr Solothurn 1930, or MG 30, respectively. 2000–3000 were also purchased by Hungary, where it was known as the Solothurn 31.M Golyószóró.
The FÉG factory in Budapest prepared for serial production under its license. From 1938 to 1944 9000 pcs of 31 M. Golyószóró light machine gun were produced. Every rifle company had 12 Solothurns, 9 of them were equipped with bipod as light machine gun, and 3 of them were equipped with tripod as medium machine gun. A total of more than 12000 machine guns came into the possession of the Hungarian Armed Forces and Székely National Guard of Transylvania, the 31 M.s that survived the war were kept in storage until 1956, after almost all of them were melted down.

Design
The gun is an air-cooled, recoil-operated design, firing standard 7.92×57mm Mauser ammunition, fed from a slightly curved 30-round magazine inserted in the left side of the weapon.  It uses a locking ring, which is located at the end of the barrel extension, to lock the bolt. Inside the locking ring, there are six sets of locking lugs, arranged as an interrupted thread, which mate with lugs cut at the rear of the bolt. Rotation of the ring, which locks and unlocks the bolt, is controlled in a mount on the outside of the ring. The gun is of relatively simple design, with most parts having a round cross-section. The tubular receiver is an extension of the barrel jacket. The butt hosts a tube which contains the return spring and its guide.

The MG 30 fired both in semi-automatic and full automatic mode depending on how far the two-stage trigger is pulled, with a rate of fire between 600 and 800 rounds per minute in full-auto. It included a folding bipod attached two-thirds down the barrel.

Variants
Rheinmetall's Borsig office modified the MG 30 design for use as an aircraft gun, producing the Flugzeugmaschinengewehr 15, or MG 15 machine gun. The primary changes were the use of a double-drum magazine holding 75 rounds, and the removal of the stock for use inside the cramped quarters of a bomber.

Further modification in 1936 led to the MG 17, which included provisions for belt-fed ammo in addition to the drums, increased the rate of fire to about 1,200 rpm, and with its design incorporating a closed-bolt firing cycle, was suitable for use on a synchronization gear system-equipped aircraft for shooting through the aircraft's own propeller.

7.92×57mm weapons were no longer considered useful by the Luftwaffe once enough MG 131s were available. The partial armour protection of most new military aircraft had caught up with the 7.92×57mm SmK cartridge by 1940. Many MG 15, MG 17 and more modern 7.92 mm MG 81 were then used by forces on the ground, especially since 1944. Many were modified with a bipod and simple metal stock, and other belt-fed MG 17 and MG 81 were built into dedicated anti-air machine gun twin and quad mounts.

Forty-seven of these machine guns were made in 7×57mm Mauser for El Salvador.

Users
 
 
 
 
 :  Solothurn 31.M Golyószóró

See also
MG 13, predecessor
MG 15, developed from the MG 30.
MG 17, developed from the MG 30 via MG 15.
MG 34, direct successor of MG 30.
Weapons employed in the Slovak-Hungarian War

References

External links

8 mm machine guns
7.92×57mm Mauser machine guns
Light machine guns
Machine guns of Austria
Machine guns of Switzerland
World War II infantry weapons of Germany
World War II machine guns
Military equipment introduced in the 1930s